Alastor ardens is a species of wasp in the family Vespidae.

References

ardens
Insects described in 1935